Plymouth Educational Center is a public K-8 charter school, located in the Vivian H. Ross Campus in Detroit, Michigan. It was formerly K-12.

History
Nicholas Hood, Sr., who had operated the Plymouth United Church of Christ Day Care Center, established a day school division in 1974. Nicholas Hood, III took control of the school in 1984. The Plymouth Day School was incorporated as a private school in 1985. The school moved to a new location in 1990, and it began to cover grades K-5. The school moved back to the church facility in 1991, occupying the lower level. It only covered grades K-2. The school began steps to become a charter school in 1992. On August 31, 1995, it was designated as a Michigan Chartered Public School Academy. The current facility opened in 1999; at the time it covered grades K-8 and had over 700 students.

See also

List of public school academy districts in Michigan

References

External links
Plymouth Educational Center

High schools in Detroit
Middle schools in Michigan
Elementary schools in Michigan
Charter schools in Michigan
Private elementary schools in Michigan
Educational institutions established in 1974
1974 establishments in Michigan
Educational institutions established in 1995
1995 establishments in Michigan